"Get to Steppin" is a 2013 song by Fast Eddie featuring singer CeCe Peniston, released as a digital single on S & S Records in the U.S. on August 26, 2013.

Credits and personnel
 Edwin A. Smith  - performer, producer
 Cecilia Peniston - lead vocals
 Stéphane Bonan  - producer, remix
 Fabrice Texier  - producer, remix
 Hamdi Hassen  - producer, remix
 Paul Anthony - producer, remix
 ZXX - producer, remix
 Audiophonix - producer, remix
 Christopher Sammarco - producer, remix
 Steven Hurley  - executive producer
 Shannon L. Syas  - executive producer

Track listing and format
 MD, EU, #MM SOLREC0234
 MD, US, #SSR1301200
 "Get to Steppin (Shane D Club Mix)" - 6:47
 "Get to Steppin (Superfunk Remix)" - 5:43
 "Get to Steppin (Paul Anthony & ZXX Remix)" - 7:11
 "Get to Steppin (Audiophonix Club Remix)" - 6:53
 "Get to Steppin (Chris Sammarco Club Remix)" - 5:57
 "Get to Steppin (Chris Sammarco Dub Remix)" - 5:41
 "Get to Steppin (Original Fast Eddie Version)" - 4:34

 MD, US, #SSR1301200
 "Get to Steppin (Chuck Daniels & Jason Hodges 2016 Remix)" - 6:17
 "Get to Steppin Chuck Daniels & Jason Hodges Original Remix)" - 7:26

References

General

 Specific

External links 
 

2013 singles
CeCe Peniston songs
2013 songs